Helena Vatanen (née Immonen; 28 December 1871, in Eno – 16 April 1937) was a Finnish farmworker's wife and politician. She was a member of the Parliament of Finland from 1911 to 1913, representing the Social Democratic Party of Finland (SDP).

References

1871 births
1937 deaths
People from Joensuu
People from Kuopio Province (Grand Duchy of Finland)
Social Democratic Party of Finland politicians
Members of the Parliament of Finland (1911–13)
Women members of the Parliament of Finland